Cecelia Condit (born 1947, in Philadelphia, Pennsylvania) is an American video artist. Condit's films are noted for their attempts to subvert traditional mythologies of female representation and psychologies of sexuality and violence.

Condit has received awards from the Guggenheim Foundation, American Film Institute, National Endowment for the Arts, Mary L. Nohl Foundation, Wisconsin Arts Council and National Media Award from the Retirement Research Foundation. Her work has shown internationally in festivals, museums and alternative spaces and is represented in collections including the Museum of Modern Art in NYC and Centre Georges Pompidou Musee National d'Art Moderne, Paris, France. In 2008, Condit had her first solo show exhibition at the CUE Art Foundation in New York.

She studied at the Pennsylvania Academy of Fine Arts, University of Pennsylvania, received a B.F.A. in sculpture from the Philadelphia College of Art and M.F.A. in photography from Tyler School of Art of Temple University. She served as professor and director of the graduate program in the Department of Film, Video, Animation, and New Genres at the University of Wisconsin-Milwaukee, before retiring in 2017.

Condit's work received renewed attention in 2015 after her short film Possibly in Michigan was posted to Reddit. Four years later, an audio clip from the same film became a viral hit on TikTok, with over 22,000 iterations created as of July 2019.

Her videos are available from the Video Data Bank, Chicago, and Electronic Arts Intermix, NYC.

Videography

Select Installations 
Condit has created a number of video installations including:

 First Dream After Mother Died (2010), a three-channel video installation that was exhibited at the North Dakota Museum of Art
 Within a Stone's Throw (2012), a three-channel video installation exhibited at the Nevada Museum of Art, the Madison Museum of Contemporary Art, and the Burren College of Art in Ireland
 Tales of Future Past (2017), a two-channel video installation exhibited at the Lynden Sculpture Garden

Personal life

Condit has two grown sons, Schuyler Vogel, who serves as the Senior Minister of the Fourth Universalist Society in the City of New York, and Lloyd Vogel, who is the CEO of Garage Grown Gear, a popular outdoor gear company.

References

 University of Wisconsin faculty profile 
 Tamblyn, Christine. “Significant Others: Social Documentary as Personal Portraiture in Women’s Video of the 1980’s.” 
 Mellencamp, Patricia, “Uncanny Feminism: The Exquisite Corpses of Cecelia Condit”, Framework, vol. 32, no. 3:104-22. 
 Doug Hall and Sally Jo Fifer's “Illuminating Video: An Essential Guide to Video Art.”

External links
 
 Condit's web page
 Video Data Bank
 Electronic Arts Intermix
 Article by Kerrie Welsh
 Vickie Callahan's Podcast
 Article from The Brooklyn Rail
CeceliaCondit.com

1947 births
Living people
Artists from Philadelphia
Temple University alumni
University of the Arts (Philadelphia)
Pennsylvania Academy of the Fine Arts alumni
University of Wisconsin–Milwaukee faculty
American experimental filmmakers